Gordon's War is a 1973 action film written by Howard Friedlander and Ed Spielman, and directed by Ossie Davis. It stars Paul Winfield as Gordon Hudson.

Plot
A Vietnam veteran returns home to find drug dealers and addicts now rule his old neighborhood, and that even his own wife has fallen victim to drugs. Together with three of his buddies from Vietnam, he fights back.

Using tactics borrowed from war that involve them not using the cops, they find that the culprit to all of the trouble is a couple of white salesmen.

Cast
 Paul Winfield as Gordon Hudson
 Carl Lee as Bee Bishop
 David Downing as Otis Russell
 Tony King as Roy Green 
 Gilbert Lewis as Harry "Spanish Harry" Martinez
 Carl Gordon as Luther "The Pimp"
 Nathan Heard as "Big Pink"
 Grace Jones as Mary 
 Jackie Page as Bedroom Girl 
 Chuck Bergansky as White Hitman
 Adam Wade as Hustler
 Hansford Rowe as Dog Salesman 
 Warren Taurien as "Goose"
 Ralph Wilcox as Black Hitman 
 David Connell as Hotel Proprietor
 Rochelle LeNoir as Gordon's Wife
 Charles McGregor as Jim, Drug Dealer On Subway Station Platform (uncredited)

Soundtrack
The music heard throughout the film has become a well-respected album in its own right, performed by Badder Than Evil, Barbara Mason, New Birth and Sister Goose And The Ducklings.

The most of songs were composed and performed by Badder Than Evil, a funk / R&B project of Albert Sahley Elias (credited as Al Elias) and Angelo Badalamenti (credited as Andy Badale). Their track Hot Wheels (the chase) has been sampled by scores of artists including Public Enemy, Coldcut and Blade.

Reception
The New York Times called it an inconclusive film, one that had a "format and substance—a black theme dramatized, for practical, constructive purposes—remain exceeded by its goal." Jacob Knight of Birth.Movies.Death called it "one of the most valuable works to come out of '70s Blaxploitation."

See also
 List of American films of 1973

References

External links

 Gordon's War at Rottentomatoes.com

1973 films
Blaxploitation films
1970s action films
20th Century Fox films
Films directed by Ossie Davis
Films set in New York City
Films scored by Angelo Badalamenti
1970s English-language films
American exploitation films
American action films
1970s American films